The 1920 Howard Bison football team was an American football team that represented Howard University during the 1920 college football season. In their first year under head coach Edward Morrison, the Bison compiled a 7–0 record, did not allow opponents to score a point, and outscored all opponents by a total of 132 to 0. For the first time following the 1920 season, the Pittsburgh Courier selected a black college national champion with Howard and Talladega sharing the honor.

Schedule

References

Howard
Howard Bison football seasons
College football undefeated seasons
Black college football national champions
Howard Bison football